The 1962 Alabama Crimson Tide football team (variously "Alabama", "UA" or "Bama") represented the University of Alabama in the 1962 NCAA University Division football season. It was the Crimson Tide's 68th overall and 29th season as a member of the Southeastern Conference (SEC). The team was led by head coach Bear Bryant, in his fifth year, and played their home games at Denny Stadium in Tuscaloosa and Legion Field in Birmingham, Alabama. They finished season with ten wins and one loss (10–1 overall, 6–1 in the SEC) and with a victory over Oklahoma in the Orange Bowl.

The Crimson Tide opened the season with a win over Georgia at Legion Field in Birmingham in week one, and then defeated Tulane in their first road game at New Orleans in week two. Alabama then defeated Vanderbilt in the second Legion Field game of the season and Houston back at Denny Stadium before they defeated Tennessee at Neyland Stadium.

The Crimson Tide then defeated Tulsa, Mississippi State and then Miami on homecoming in Tuscaloosa that extended their winning streak to 19-games and their unbeaten streak to 26-games. The next week Alabama lost their first game since the 1960 season when they were upset 7–6 by Georgia Tech at Atlanta. They rebounded with wins over Auburn in the Iron Bowl that closed the regular season and against Oklahoma in the Orange Bowl.

Schedule

Game summaries

Georgia

Sources:

To open the 1962 season, the Crimson Tide shutout the Georgia Bulldogs 35–0 in what was the first start for quarterback Joe Namath with the Crimson Tide varsity squad. Alabama scored their first points of the season in the opening four minutes of the game when Namath threw a 52-yard touchdown pass to Richard Williamson. They then extended their lead to 9–0 late in the quarter when Jake Saye was tackled for a safety by Larry Morten on a failed punt attempt. Namath further extended the Crimson Tide lead to 21–0 in the third quarter before he was sat by Coach Bryant late in the third. He threw a pair of touchdown passes to Cotton Clark, in the second on a ten-yard pass and in the third on a 12-yard pass. Alabama then closed the game with fourth-quarter touchdown runs of four-yards by Clark and 25-yards by Hudson Harris that made the final score 35–0. The victory improved Alabama's all-time record against Georgia to 26–18–4.

Tulane

Sources:

After their victory over Georgia to open the season, Alabama up two spots in the AP Poll to the No. 1 position. On a Friday evening at New Orleans, the Crimson Tide defeated the Tulane Green Wave 44–6 in their first road game of the season. Alabama took a 14–0 first quarter lead on Butch Wilson runs of seven and one-yard before Tulane scored their lone points on a six-yard Wilson Miller touchdown pass to Clement Dellenger that made the score 14–6 early in the second quarter. The Green Wave touchdown was the first allowed by the Crimson Tide defense over a period that spanned 35 quarters back to their win over NC State in 1961.

The Crimson Tide responded with 22 second quarter points and took a 36–6 halftime lead. Cotton Clark scored first on an 11-yard run, Joe Namath second on a one-yard run and then Clark scored again on a 23-yard pass from Namath. After a scoreless third, Namath threw a two-yard touchdown pass to Clark in the fourth and made the final score 44–6. The victory improved Alabama's all-time record against Tulane to 20–10–3.

Vanderbilt

Sources:

Although they defeated Tulane on the road, Alabama dropped from the No. 1 to No. 2 position in the AP Poll prior to their game against Vanderbilt. In the second Legion Field game of the season, the Crimson Tide defeated the Commodores 17–7 at Birmingham. Vanderbilt scored their first points of the 1962 season when Terrell Dye recovered a Cotton Clark fumbled punt in the endzone for a 7–0 lead. Alabama responded on the drive that ensued with a 19-yard Joe Namath touchdown pass to Butch Henry and tied the game 7–7. The Crimson Tide then took a 14–7 lead early in the third quarter after Namath threw a 34-yard touchdown pass to Richard Williamson. A 20-yard Tim Davis field goal in the fourth quarter then made the final score 17–7. The victory improved Alabama's all-time record against Vanderbilt to 21–16–4.

Houston

Sources:

With their victory over Vanderbilt, coupled with an Ohio State loss to UCLA, the Crimson Tide moved back into the No. 1 position in the polls prior to their game against Houston. Against the Cougars, the Alabama defense was dominant and allowed minus 49 yards rushing in this 14–3 victory at Denny Stadium. Houston took an early 3–0 lead after a Gene Ritch interception set up a 30-yard Bill McMillan field goal in the first quarter. The Crimson Tide responded in the second quarter and took a 7–3 halftime lead when Lee Roy Jordan recovered a Cougars' fumble in the endzone for a touchdown. Cotton Clark then provided the final points of the game with his three-yard touchdown run in the third quarter that made the final score 14–3. The victory improved Alabama's all-time record against Houston to 4–0.

Tennessee

Sources:

Alabama dropped from the No. 1 position back into the No. 2 spot in the week leading into their game at Tennessee. Against the Volunteers, Alabama won 27–7 for Coach Bryant's first all-time victory at Neyland Stadium. The Crimson Tide took a 12–0 halftime lead after Tim Davis converted a pair of field goals in the first and Joe Namath threw a 35-yard touchdown pass to Benny Nelson in the second quarter. The Vols responded in the third quarter with a six-yard Bobby Morton touchdown pass to Jerry Ensley that cut the Alabama lead to 12–7. However, the Crimson Tide closed the game with a pair of fourth-quarter touchdowns. The first touchdown came on a three-yard Cotton Clark run and the second on a 20-yard Jack Hurlbut pass to Benny Nelson and made the final score 27–7. The victory improved Alabama's all-time record against Tennessee to 20–19–6.

Tulsa

Sources:

As they entered their game against Tulsa, the Crimson Tide retained the No. 2 spot in the polls behind Texas. In their non-conference matchup against the Golden Hurricane, Alabama only allowed Tulsa to cross midfield once in the first half en route to a 35–6 victory. Richard Williamson opened the game with a recovered Tulsa fumble on the first offensive play of the game, and four plays later Alabama led 7–0 on a one-yard Joe Namath touchdown run. After a second, one-yard Namath touchdown run, Cotton Clark made what was then the third longest touchdown score in Alabama history with his 91-yard run that made the halftime score 21–0. The Crimson Tide extended their lead further to 35–0 in the fourth quarter with touchdown runs of two-yards by Clark and eight-yards by Gary Martin. However, the shutout bid ended late in the fourth after the Golden Hurricane scored their only points on a one-yard Jerry Swanson touchdown run that made the final score 35–6. The victory improved Alabama's all-time record against Tulsa to 3–0.

Mississippi State

Sources:

After their victory over Tulsa, Alabama retained their No. 2 ranking as they prepared to play Mississippi State. On homecoming at Starkville, the Crimson Tide shutout the Bulldogs 20–0. Alabama took an early lead when Cotton Clark scored on a four-yard touchdown run in the first quarter for a 7–0 lead. Joe Namath was then responsible for the final pair of touchdowns on passes of 27 and three-yards to Bill Battle in the second and third quarters for the 20–0 victory. The victory improved Alabama's all-time record against Mississippi State to 34–10–3.

Miami

Sources:

Although they shutout Mississippi State one the road, Alabama dropped into the No. 3 ranking as they prepared to play Miami. On homecoming in Tuscaloosa, Alabama trailed the Hurricanes 3–0 at halftime but rallied with 36 unanswered points in the second half for the 36–3 victory. The first half was dominated by both defenses with the only points scored by Miami in the second quarter on a 40-yard Bob Wilson field goal. The Crimson Tide then scored three third-quarter touchdowns and took a 23–3 lead into the fourth quarter. Points were scored by Cotton Clark on runs of one and six-yards and on a 12-yard Joe Namath pass to Bill Battle. A pair of fourth-quarter touchdowns on one-yard runs by Namath and Jack Hurlbut made the finals score 36–3. The victory improved Alabama's all-time record against Miami to 4–2.

Georgia Tech

Sources: 

For their game at Grant Field against Georgia Tech, the Crimson Tide moved back into the No. 1 position in the national polls. In the game, the Yellow Jackets ended Alabama's 19-game winning and 26-game unbeaten streak that dated back to the Crimson Tide's 1960 season, with their 7–6 upset in Atlanta. After a scoreless first quarter, Georgia Tech scored their only touchdown on a nine-yard Patrick McNames run for a 7–0 lead. The Yellow Jackets continued to hold the Crimson Tide scoreless until the fourth quarter when Cotton Clark scored on a two-yard run. However instead of playing for the tie with an extra point attempt, Bryant decided to go for a two-point conversion that failed and resulted in the eventual 7–6 Tech win. In defeat, Joe Namath threw four interceptions. The loss brought Alabama's all-time record against Georgia Tech to 22–19–3.

Auburn

Sources:

After their loss against Georgia Tech, Alabama dropped to No. 6 in the AP Poll, but in the week prior to their game against Auburn, they moved into the No. 5 position. Against the Tigers in the annual Iron Bowl game at Legion Field, Alabama shutout Auburn for the fourth consecutive season, this time by a score of 38–0. On the first offensive play of the game, Alabama took a 7–0 lead when George Wilson scored on a 92-yard touchdown run. They then extended their lead to 21–0 at halftime after touchdowns were scored on a 17-yard Joe Namath run and when Bill Battle recovered a blocked punt in the endzone in the second quarter. The Crimson Tide then closed the game with 17 second half points and won 38–0. Points were scored in the third on a 15-yard Namath touchdown pass to Cotton Clark and on a 39-yard Tim Davis field goal in the third and on a 16-yard Namath pass to Richard Williamson in the fourth quarter. The victory improved Alabama's all-time record against Auburn to 13–13–1.

Oklahoma

Sources:

After their victory over Auburn, the Crimson Tide formally accepted an invitation to play Big Eight Conference champion Oklahoma in the 1963 edition of the Orange Bowl. In what was the first all-time meeting between the schools, Alabama shutout the Sooners 17–0 behind a dominant performance by linebacker Lee Roy Jordan who set a school bowl record with his 31 tackles. Alabama took a 14–0 halftime lead after touchdowns were scored on a 25-yard Joe Namath pass to Richard Williamson in the first and on a 15-yard Cotton Clark run in the second quarter. A 19-yard Tim Davis field goal in the third quarter provided for the final 17–0 margin of victory.

NFL/AFL Draft
Several players that were varsity lettermen from the 1962 squad were drafted into the National Football League (NFL) and the American Football League (AFL) between the 1963 and 1965 drafts. These players included the following:

Freshman squad
Prior to the 1972 NCAA University Division football season, NCAA rules prohibited freshmen from participating on the varsity team, and as such many schools fielded freshmen teams. For the 1962 season, the Alabama freshmen squad was coached by Sam Bailey and finished their season with a record of two wins and one loss (2–1). In their first game of the season, Alabama  defeated Mississippi State 20–2 at Denny Stadium. Alabama took a 6–0 first quarter lead on a one-yard Dickie Bean touchdown run that was set up by a 69-yard Vernon Newbill interception return. They extended their lead further to 13–0 later in the quarter when Steve Sloan scored on a 28-yard touchdown run. State then scored their only points in the second quarter when Mike Childs sacked Sloan in the endzone for a safety that made the halftime score 13–2. After a scoreless third, Alabama made the final score 20–2 after Jimmy Mitchell scored on a seven-yard touchdown run.

In their second game, the Baby Tide defeated Tulane 27–16 at Tulane Stadium, but then lost to Auburn in their season finale at Denny Stadium 14–13. Alabama took an early 7–0 lead when Dickie Bean scored on a one-yard touchdown run. Auburn then responded and took a 14–7 halftime lead with a pair of second-quarter touchdowns. The first came on a 96-yard Gerald Gross kickoff return and the second on a 62-yard Joe Campbell pass to Gross. Late in the fourth, Alabama scored on a 27-yard Steve Sloan touchdown pass to Jerry Duncan; however, Sloan's two-point conversion attempt was intercepted by Bill Cody and the Tigers won 14–13.

Personnel

Varsity letter winners

Coaching staff

References
General

 
 

Specific

Alabama
Alabama Crimson Tide football seasons
Orange Bowl champion seasons
Alabama Crimson Tide football